Huntington Prep or Huntington St. Joseph Prep is a basketball-focused college preparatory school located in Huntington, West Virginia.   Huntington Prep was originally unrelated to the public Huntington High School located in the same city, though now Huntington Prep players go to school at Huntington High after Huntington Prep's host relationship with St. Joseph Central Catholic High School ended in 2020.

School
Huntington Prep was originally housed within St. Joseph Central Catholic High School, a religious school, but in 2020 ended that relationship. The students were regular St. Joseph's students and had to abide by the rules and regulations of the high school. After becoming an accepted part of the school, Huntington Prep became Huntington St. Joseph Prep (even wearing the St. Joe emblem on the uniforms). Since 2021, Huntington Prep became part of Cabell County Schools after they moved host schools to Huntington High School.

Basketball program
Huntington Prep is one of the top ten basketball programs in the nation and features some of the top high school level players in the world, including 2013 graduate Andrew Wiggins.

All students are considered NCAA Division I prospects and are recruited by some of the top programs in the country. They practice at the Marshall Rec Center and live in Huntington, WV, with "home" games formerly played at the now demolished Veterans Memorial Fieldhouse, then the St. Joseph High School gym. They now play at Huntington High, with some home games scheduled at Marshall University's Cam Henderson Center.

The team's original nickname was the "Express," which was a derivative of the nickname of the former Huntington High School, "Pony Express," while acknowledging the city's railroad heritage. 
Huntington Prep then changed its nickname to the "Fighting Irish," the same as St. Joe's other teams.

The school colors are Carolina Blue and yellow, and the team is under contract with Adidas.

Huntington Prep's first player to be drafted in the NBA was former Louisville Cardinal and national champion Gorgui Dieng in 2013. Gorgui was selected 21st overall by the Utah Jazz and then traded to the Minnesota Timberwolves.

2013 graduate Andrew Wiggins was the number one pick in the 2014 NBA draft after he played college basketball for the University of Kansas.

Some of the former players playing in college currently are Josh Perkins (Gonzaga), Ivan Gandia (North Florida), Curtis Jones (Oklahoma State), Maurice Calloo (Oklahoma State), Chase Johnson (Dayton), Kenny Nwuba (UCLA), Chris Smith (UCLA), Dontarius James (Xavier). As of 2021, they have had fourteen alumni play in the NBA.

Founder of Huntington Prep and head coach Rob Fulford left the program after the 2013-2014 Season to take an assistant coaching position with the University of Missouri, and is currently an assistant at the University of Akron. Fulford's assistant at Huntington Prep, Arkell Bruce, took over the program starting with the 2014-2015 Season.

Players on this year's team hail from China, South Sudan, The Republic of Congo, Canada, the USA, and Nigeria.

Notable players 

Class of 2010 - Gorgui Dieng, San Antonio Spurs
Class of 2012 - Sim Bhullar, Sacramento Kings 
Class of 2013 - Andrew Wiggins, Golden State Warriors
Class of 2013 - Xavier Rathan-Mayes, Melbourne United of the National Basketball League (Australia)
Class of 2013 - Josh Perkins, Hapoel Gilboa Galil of the Israeli Basketball Premier League
Class of 2015 - Thomas Bryant, Los Angeles Lakers
Class of 2016 - Miles Bridges, Charolette Hornets
Class of 2018 - Keldon Johnson, San Antonio Spurs
Class of 2019 - JT Thor, Charolette Hornets
Class of 2019 - Jonathan Kuminga (freshman year), Golden State Warriors
Class of 2019 - Joshua Primo, San Antonio Spurs

See also
 Oak Hill Academy

References

External links
 

Private high schools in West Virginia
Buildings and structures in Huntington, West Virginia
Schools in Cabell County, West Virginia
2009 establishments in West Virginia
Educational institutions established in 2009